Sungai, or Abai Sungai after the village in which it is spoken, is a minor language of Sabah, Malaysia.

References

Paitanic languages
Languages of Malaysia